The 1923–24 Chicago Maroons men's basketball team represented the University of Chicago.

Regular season
The 1923–24 Chicago Maroons men's basketball season was the third of thirty-four seasons for head coach Nelson Norgren.  This group was last Big Ten champion for the Maroons as they would leave the conference in 1946.  The team would play 12  conference games and finish with 8 wins and 4 losses (a 66.6% winning percentage).  The Maroons were led by captain Campbell Dickson, who would go on to coach football at Minnesota, Chicago, Beloit, Wisconsin, Princeton, Michigan and Hamilton. Additionally, the team rounded out the starting five with Harrison Barnes and Joseph Duggan at guard, Harold Alea and Dickson at forward, and William Weiss at center.

At seasons end, Campbell Dickson, was awarded the Big Ten Medal of Honor, while also being named 1st-team all-conference forward.

Roster

Head Coach: Nelson Norgren (3rd year at Chicago)

Schedule

|-	

|- align="center" bgcolor=""

			

Bold Italic connotes conference game

Awards and honors
 Campbell Dickson achieved the Big Ten Medal of Honor following the 1923–24 seasons.

References

Chicago Maroons men's basketball seasons
Chicago
Chicago Maroons Men's Basketball Team
Chicago Maroons Men's Basketball Team